Allium trachycoleum is a Middle Eastern species of wild onion found in Israel, Palestine, Lebanon, Syria, Jordan, Turkey, and Iraq. It is a bulb-forming perennial up to 70 cm tall, with an umbel of white and green flowers.

References

trachycoleum
Onions
Plants described in 1969